"Sunshine" is the fourth single released by singer Dino from his 1989 album 24/7.

Track listing
US 12" Single

Charts

References

1989 singles
Dino (singer) songs
1989 songs